Mõhu was a small landlocked ancient Estonian county in the central part of the territory of Estonia. It was later conquered by the Teutonic Order during the Estonian Crusade.

See also 
Livonian Crusade

References

External links 
Kuidas elasid inimesed vanasti, möödunud sajandil ja praegu (Estonian)
9. - 13. saj.pärinevad Eesti aardeleiud (Estonian)
Eesti haldusjaotus ja võõrvõimude vaheldumine läbi aegade (Estonian)

Ancient counties of Estonia